Hawaii Technology Academy (HTA) is a public charter school in the U.S. state of Hawaii.

About 
Hawaii Technology Academy (HTA) is a Hawaiian public charter school.  There are sites across the state's islands, with the largest on Oahu. HTA uses a blended learning model. It uses a combination of face-to-face instruction, virtual instruction, and independent learning. An involved Learning Coach, or adult responsible for mentoring, monitoring and motivating students’ learning at home is a defining aspect of HTA.

Education style 
HTA offers students a blended experience with face-to-face and virtual instruction as well as independent learning. Students receive face-to-face instruction from teachers at their designated learning center, or live instruction from a teacher through the use of a virtual learning platform. Students also work from home with their parent as a learning coach to complete online and teacher-created curriculum.

Location
HTA's main office and primary learning center is currently located in Waipahu, Hawaii.  HTA operates across the entire state, with learning centers in Hilo and Kona, as well as other learning locations across Maui and Kauai.

During summer 2016, HTA moved its Oahu building to 94-450 Mokuola Street, Waipahu, Hawaii.

HTA serves students in four main locations:

Hawaii Island - West
Kauai
Maui
Oahu

Population
Total enrollment for the 2014–2015 school year was 1123 students.  There were 748 students in grades K-8 and 375 students in high school.

Technology
HTA uses a "Bring Your Own Device" (BYOD) structure for computer usage, provided the computer meets certain minimum specifications. All students are required to have a computer in order to utilize the online curriculum and various online tools and resources.

HTA also has a computer loan program for students. The laptops vary in manufacturer and style, based on the students' needs, as determined by their grade and course load.

References 

Public elementary schools in Hawaii
Public middle schools in Hawaii
Public high schools in Hawaii
Online K–12 schools
Online schools in the United States
Waipahu, Hawaii